The GwL class vans of the Royal Bavarian State Railways were goods vans built for branch lines in the Kingdom of Bavaria in the late 19th and early 20th centuries.

Procurement 
The branch lines in Bavaria were generally known as Lokalbahnen, literally "local railways", and were of particularly light construction entailing the use of lightweight rolling stock. Between 1884 and 1906, 258 vans of the class GwL were built for this purpose in a number of batches each with a different designation.

Description 
The GwL class were covered vans which had the appearance of Lokalbahn coaching stock, including similar lettering. The vans were had open platforms at both ends. Access to the loading area was either via a pair of hinged doors or a single door in the centre of the side walls. On either side of the doors was a window. The wheelbase of the earliest vans was 3.63 m, but was later increased to 3.8 and eventually 4.5 m. The overall length also increased from 8.224 m to 8.624 m.

See also 
The following coaches were also built for the Lokalbahn branch line network:
 BCL Bay 09, long passenger coach
 CL Bay 06b, short passenger coach
 CL Bay 11a, long passenger coach
 PwPost Bay 06, mail/luggage van

References

Literature 
 Konrad, Emil (1984). Die Reisezugwagen der deutschen Länderbahnen, Band 2: Bayern, Württemberg, Baden.  Stuttgart: Franckh'sche Verlagshandlung W.Keller & Co. 

Railway coaches of the Royal Bavarian State Railways